Houston Express is a cargo ship owned by the Hapag-Lloyd company of Hamburg, Germany, completed in 2005. The ship is capable of transporting up to 8,400 containers at any one time. The ship is 332 meters long and has a beam (or width) of 43.20 meters. The engines are capable of outputting 68,520 kilowatts of power.

The Houston Express, as well as her sister ships Savannah Express and Mærsk Stralsund, are owned by Norddeutsche Vermögen and managed by Norddeutsche Reederei H. Schuldt. The ships have been built in a series of five vessels. They feature the first twisted leading edge full spade rudder (TLKSR) of Becker Marine Systems. The 67sqm rudder avoids rudder cavitation and saves 2% fuel.

In April 2015, the Houston Express rescued a 37-year-old man, Louis Jordan, whose capsized boat had left him adrift for 66 days.

References

External links

Merchant ships of Germany
Container ships
2005 ships
Ships built by Daewoo Shipbuilding & Marine Engineering